MFK Rožňava is a Slovak football team, based in the town of Rožňava.

Current squad

Colours
Club colours are yellow and blue.

External links
Official club website 
  
Club profile at Futbalnet.sk

References

Football clubs in Slovakia
Association football clubs established in 1918